Banankoro is a town in the Beyla Prefecture the Nzérékoré Region of eastern Guinea. It is located to the west of the iron ore deposits at Simandou.

Transport 
The town is served by Gbenko Airport.

Populated places in the Nzérékoré Region